The Helsinki Samba Carnaval is an annual samba carnival held in Helsinki, the capital of Finland, since 1991.

The carnival takes place on the weekend in early to middle June, normally close to the Helsinki Day on 12 June. Unlike the Rio Carnival, it is not possible to hold the carnival in January through March, because like many other places in northern Europe, the outdoor temperature in Helsinki is far too low at that time.

History
The carnival lacks a proper historical tradition. It mostly grew from experimenting and organising, but was still influenced by Brazilian traditions. In 2007, Tarja Halonen, President of Finland at the time, participated in the event.

The organisation responsible for the event is the Finnish Samba School Association (in Finnish: Suomen Sambakoulujen Liitto). It organized the samba carnival for the first time in 1991 in Turku, but since 1993, Helsinki has been established as the official carnival location. The association has been awarded the esteemed Insignia of the Order of Rio Branco by the Federative Republic of Brazil.

Samba schools

Império do Papagaio from Helsinki
Força Natural also from Helsinki
Carioca from Turku
Maracanã from Lahti
El Gambo from Kokkola
Tropical from Seinäjoki
União da Roseira from Tampere

References

External links

 Official website

Carnivals in Finland
Festivals in Helsinki
Recurring events established in 1991
Samba
Summer events in Finland